Frederick Augustus "Fred" Alexander (30 December 1870 – 20 April 1937) was a South African international rugby union player.

Biography
Born in Malmesbury, he attended Kimberley Boys' High School before playing provincial rugby for Griqualand West (now known as the Griquas). He made his only two Test appearances for South Africa during Great Britain's 1891 tour. Alexander was selected to play as a forward in the 1st and 2nd matches of the series, both of which South Africa lost. Alexander died in 1937, in Johannesburg, at the age of 66.

Test history

See also
List of South Africa national rugby union players – Springbok no. 13

References

1870 births
1937 deaths
People from Malmesbury, Western Cape
White South African people
South African rugby union players
South Africa international rugby union players
Rugby union forwards
Rugby union players from the Western Cape
Griquas (rugby union) players